Charles Pillsbury may refer to:
 Charles Alfred Pillsbury (1842–1899), flour magnate
 Charles Pillsbury (attorney), Connecticut attorney and activist